Finey may refer to:

Finey, Missouri, a community in the United States
Finey (Haa Dhaalu Atoll), an atoll in the Maldives

See also
Finney (disambiguation)